Giacomo Faticanti (born 31 July 2004) is an Italian professional footballer who plays as a defensive midfielder for Serie A club Roma.

In 2021, he was included in The Guardian's yearly list of the 60 best talents born in 2004 in world football.

Club career 
Born and raised in Sora, Faticanti started playing football at the local grassroots club, before joining Frosinone in 2010, and then moving to AS Roma's youth sector in 2018.

Here, he won both the under-15 and under-17 national titles, respectively, in 2019 and 2021. Having already started playing with the under-19 team in 2021, the midfielder became a regular starter of the squad throughout the 2021-22 season.

In the summer of 2022, Faticanti began training with the first team, led by José Mourinho, during their pre-season, as he featured in friendlies against Portimonense and Sunderland. In August of the same year, he signed a contract extension with the club until 2026, and then made his first bench appearances for Roma's first team.

On 27 October 2022, Faticanti made his professional debut, coming in as a substitute for Cristian Volpato at the 78th minute of the UEFA Europa League match against HJK, which ended in a 2-1 win for his side.

International career 
Faticanti has represented Italy at various youth international levels.

Having first played for the under-15 national team, he featured regularly with the under-16 team, a side that he soon went on to captain. Then, he played for the under-18, under-19 and under-20 national teams.

In June 2022, he was included in the squad that took part in the 2022 UEFA European Under-19 Championship in Slovakia, where the Azzurrini reached the semi-finals before losing to eventual winners England.

In December of the same year, he was involved in a training camp led by the Italian senior national team's manager, Roberto Mancini, as part of a stage aimed to the most promising national talents.

Style of play 
Faticanti is mainly a defensive midfielder, who has been regarded for his reading of the game, his aerial skills and his tackling. He can also act as a deep-lying playmaker, thanks to his ability to dictate the tempo and his wide range of passing. Moreover, he has shown a considerable amount of stamina, work rate and leadership skills, which led him to become the captain of his side in various occasions.

Although he named Sergio Busquets between his sources of inspiration, the Italian player has also been compared to Daniele De Rossi, who played in his same role and similarly started his career at AS Roma.

In 2021, he was included in The Guardian's yearly list of the 60 best talents born in 2004 in world football.

Career statistics

References

External links

 
 

2004 births
Living people
Italian footballers
Italy youth international footballers
Association football midfielders
Frosinone Calcio players
A.S. Roma players
People from Sora, Lazio